Telibandha railway station was a narrow gauge railway station in Raipur district, Chhattisgarh. Its code was TBD. It served Raipur city. The station consisted of one platform. The station lied on the former Raipur–Dhamtari branch line of Bilaspur–Nagpur section.

This narrow gauge section has been closed for all services and the tracks have been removed and the space has been converted to an expressway connecting Raipur Junction railway station and Kendri village near Swami Vivekanand Airport. The remaining portion of the section is being upgraded to broad gauge with a new alignment connecting Kendri to the under construction Naya Raipur - Atal Nagar Railway Station.

References

Railway stations in Raipur district
Raipur railway division